Passenger-carrying vehicles or PCVs are motor vehicles that are subject, in their respective jurisdictions, and/or under the respective insurance programs that define the term, to requirements beyond those typically applying to private passenger cars. Profit-making buses charging fares are those most certain to be included. Sometimes vans transporting people, or even taxis, are likewise categorized as PCVs. 

Bus terminology